The coat of arms of Prince Edward Island was begun when the shield and motto in the achievement were granted in 1905 by royal warrant of the King Edward VII.

History
In the chief of the shield is the lion passant (or "leopard") of England. The lower portion depicts three oak saplings, representing the Island's three counties, beneath a mature oak that originally represented Great Britain. Prior to the adoption of the current coat of arms, the trees were used, without the lion, as the symbol of the province.

The additions to the arms were granted on 26 April 2002, and the process was completed on 13 December 2002, when the Right Honourable Adrienne Clarkson, Governor General of Canada, unveiled the crest, supporters, and compartment, after which the full achievement was taken into official use. This was requested by Prince Edward Island Premier Pat Binns to commemorate the 150th anniversary of responsible government on the island.

Symbolism
The crest is a crowned blue jay holding in its beak a sprig of red oak, both symbols of the island. The crown represents royal sovereignty and its use in the arms is an honour granted by the King.

The thistles represent Scotland. The Red rose represents the house of Lancaster whilst the white rose in the middle represents the house of York.

The supporters are silver foxes, rare animals native to the region; fur farming was perfected on Prince Edward Island, and Island silver fox fur was prized. The fox also represents sagacity and wit. To denote other Island industries, one fox wears a garland of potato blossoms, and another one wears a length of fishing net.

The compartment centres on a Mi'kmaq eight-pointed star symbol representing the sun; this is surrounded by roses for England, lilies for France, thistles for Scotland, and shamrocks for Ireland, as well as Lady's Slippers, the floral emblem of the island.

The island's motto, Parva sub ingenti (the small under the protection of the great), is taken from Virgil's Georgics. The full quotation is:

...etiam Parnasia laurus parva sub ingenti matris se subicit umbra.'''
...so too a small plant, beneath its mother's mighty shade, upshoots the laurel-tree of Parnassus.

It has been the island's motto since 1769.

 Blazon 

The shield was blazoned by Royal Warrant on 30 May 1905, as:Argent on an island Vert, to the sinister an oak tree fructed, to the dexter thereof three oak saplings sprouting all proper, on a chief Gules a lion passant guardant Or.

The warrant also specified the motto Parva sub ingenti.

This was augmented by proclamation, recorded in the PEI Royal Gazette, 21 December 2002, with the following:A HELMET: Or mantled Gules doubled Argent with a wreath of these colours;AND FOR A CREST: On a grassy mount a blue jay (Cyanocitta cristata) reguardant crowned with the Royal Crown and bearing in its beak a leaf of the red oak tree (Quercus rubra L.) fructed proper;AND FOR SUPPORTERS: Two foxes (Vulpes fulva) Sable embellished Argent, that to the dexter gorged with a collar of potato blossoms proper, that to the sinister gorged with a length of fishnet Argent, both on a mount Vert set with a Mi'kmaq star Azure between lady's slipper flowers (Cypripedium acaule), red roses, thistles, shamrocks and white lilies proper.''

See also 
Symbols of Prince Edward Island
Flag of Prince Edward Island
List of Canadian provincial and territorial symbols
Heraldry

External links 
Armorial Bearings (Government of Prince Edward Island)
Arms of Prince Edward Island in the online Public Register of Arms, Flags and Badges

Prince Edward Island
Provincial symbols of Prince Edward Island
Prince Edward Island
Prince Edward Island
Prince Edward Island
Prince Edward Island

Prince Edward Island
Prince Edward Island
Prince Edward Island
Prince Edward Island
Prince Edward Island
2002 establishments in Prince Edward Island
1905 establishments in Canada